Vlastimil Balín (born 23 October 1950 in Most) is a Czech politician and former senator. He was a member of the Communist Party of Bohemia and Moravia.

External links
 Official site 

1950 births
Living people
Members of the Senate of the Czech Republic
Communist Party of Bohemia and Moravia Senators
People from Most (city)